Georges Édouard Johin (31 July 1877 in Paris – 6 December 1955 in Tessancourt-sur-Aubette) was a French croquet player and Olympic champion. He received a silver medal in Singles, one ball at the 1900 Summer Olympics in Paris.

He also received a gold medal in Doubles (with Gaston Aumoitte), as the only participants in that competition.

References

External links

French croquet players
Olympic croquet players of France
Croquet players at the 1900 Summer Olympics
Olympic gold medalists for France
Olympic silver medalists for France
1877 births
1955 deaths
Medalists at the 1900 Summer Olympics
Sportspeople from Paris